Charlieskin Village is an unincorporated community in Southeast Fairbanks Census Area, Alaska, United States.  Its elevation is 1,696 feet (517 m).  The community lies along Charlieskin Creek, 5.5 miles (8.8 km) south of Northway Junction, near Kathakne. The village site is now within Northway CDP. As of 2019, there are no longer any buildings at the location on aerial maps. It has never reported a population on the census.

References

Unincorporated communities in Southeast Fairbanks Census Area, Alaska
Unincorporated communities in Alaska
Unincorporated communities in Unorganized Borough, Alaska